Leadwood may refer to:

 Ceratostigma, a genus of flowering plants native to Africa and Asia
 Combretum imberbe, an African tree
 Krugiodendron ferreum, a species of tree found in the Americas
 Leadwood, Missouri, U.S.